Maskorama is a Norwegian  reality singing competition television series based on the South Korean television series King of Mask Singer. The first season premiered on Saturday, 7 November 2020 and concluded on Saturday, 12 December 2020. The second season premiered on Saturday, 6 November 2021 and concluded on 11 December. The third season premiered on 15 October 2022 and concluded on 19 November.

The show features celebrities singing songs while wearing head-to-toe costumes and face masks concealing their identities. It employs panelists who guess the celebrities' identities by interpreting clues provided to them throughout the series.

Host and panelists 
Presenter  is the main host of the show in addition to serving as an executive producer & director. The panelists consisted of stylist , singer Marion Ravn, and comedian Nicolay Ramm.

Series overview

Season 1 (2020)

Contestants

Episodes

Week 1 (7 November)

Week 2 (14 November)

Week 3 (21 November)

Week 4 (28 November)

Week 5 (5 December)

Week 6 (12 December) - Finale 
 Group Performance: "The Greatest Show" from The Greatest Showman

Season 2 (2021)

Contestants

Episodes

Week 1 (6 November)

Week 2 (13 November)

Week 3 (20 November)

Week 4 (27 November)

Week 5 (4 December)

Week 6 (11 December) - Finale 
 Group Performance: "Don't Stop Me Now" by Queen/"Never Gonna Give You Up" by Rick Astley

Season 3 (2022)

Contestants

Episodes

Week 1 (15 October)

Week 2 (22 October)

Week 3 (29 October)

Week 4 (5 November)

Week 5 (12 November)  
 Guest panellist: Else Kåss Furuseth

Week 6 (19 November) - Finale 
 Group performance: "All Night Long (All Night)" by Lionel Richie
 Guest panellist: Vegard Harm

References

Masked Singer
2020 Norwegian television series debuts
Norwegian reality television series
Norwegian-language television shows